Maple syrup is a syrup made from the sap of maple trees. In cold climates, these trees store starch in their trunks and roots before winter; the starch is then converted to sugar that rises in the sap in late winter and early spring. Maple trees are tapped by drilling holes into their trunks and collecting the sap, which is processed by heating to evaporate much of the water, leaving the concentrated syrup.

Maple syrup was first made by the Indigenous peoples of North America. The practice was adopted by European settlers, who gradually changed production methods. Technological improvements in the 1970s further refined syrup processing. Virtually all of the world's maple syrup is produced in Canada and the United States. The Canadian province of Quebec is the largest producer, responsible for 70 percent of the world's output; Canadian exports of maple syrup in 2016 were C$487 million (about US$360 million), with Quebec accounting for some 90 percent of this total.

Maple syrup is graded based on its colour and taste. Sucrose is the most prevalent sugar in maple syrup. In Canada, syrups must be made exclusively from maple sap to qualify as maple syrup and must also be at least 66 percent sugar. In the United States, a syrup must be made almost entirely from maple sap to be labelled as "maple", though states such as Vermont and New York have more restrictive definitions.

Maple syrup is often used as a condiment for pancakes, waffles, French toast, oatmeal, or porridge. It is also used as an ingredient in baking and as a sweetener or flavouring agent. Culinary experts have praised its unique flavour, although the chemistry responsible is not fully understood.

Sources 

Three species of maple (Acer) trees are predominantly used to produce maple syrup: the sugar maple (Acer saccharum), the black maple (A. nigrum), and the red maple (A. rubrum), because of the high sugar content (roughly two to five percent) in the sap of these species. The black maple is included as a subspecies or variety in a more broadly viewed concept of A. saccharum, the sugar maple, by some botanists. Of these, the red maple has a shorter season because it buds earlier than sugar and black maples, which alters the flavour of the sap.

A few other species of maple are also sometimes used as sources of sap for producing maple syrup, including the box elder or Manitoba maple (Acer negundo), the silver maple (A. saccharinum), and the bigleaf maple (A. macrophyllum). In the Southeastern United States, Florida sugar maple (Acer floridanum) is occasionally used for maple syrup production.

Similar syrups may also be produced from walnut, birch, or palm trees, among other sources.

History

Indigenous peoples 

Indigenous peoples living in northeastern North America were the first groups known to have produced maple syrup and maple sugar. According to Indigenous oral traditions, as well as archaeological evidence, maple tree sap was being processed into syrup long before Europeans arrived in the region. There are no authenticated accounts of how maple syrup production and consumption began, but various legends exist; one of the most popular involves maple sap being used in place of water to cook venison served to a chief. Indigenous tribes developed rituals around syrup-making, celebrating the Sugar Moon (the first full moon of spring) with a Maple Dance. Many aboriginal dishes replaced the salt traditional in European cuisine with maple syrup.

The Algonquians recognized maple sap as a source of energy and nutrition. At the beginning of the spring thaw, they made V-shaped incisions in tree trunks; they then inserted reeds or concave pieces of bark to run the sap into clay buckets or tightly woven birch-bark baskets. The maple sap was concentrated first by leaving it exposed to the cold temperatures overnight and disposing of the layer of ice that formed on top. Following that, the sap was transported by sled to large fires where it was boiled in clay pots to produce maple syrup. Often, multiple pots were used in conjunction, with the liquid being transferred between them as it grew more concentrated. Contrary to popular belief, syrup was not produced by dropping heated stones into wooden bowls.

European colonists

In the early stages of European colonization in northeastern North America, local Indigenous peoples showed the arriving colonists how to tap the trunks of certain types of maples during the spring thaw to harvest the sap. André Thevet, the "Royal Cosmographer of France", wrote about Jacques Cartier drinking maple sap during his Canadian voyages. By 1680, European settlers and fur traders were involved in harvesting maple products. However, rather than making incisions in the bark, the Europeans used the method of drilling tapholes in the trunks with augers. Prior to the 19th century, processed maple sap was used primarily as a source of concentrated sugar, in both liquid and crystallized-solid form, as cane sugar had to be imported from the West Indies.

Maple sugaring parties typically began to operate at the start of the spring thaw in regions of woodland with sufficiently large numbers of maples. Syrup makers first bored holes in the trunks, usually more than one hole per large tree; they then inserted wooden spouts into the holes and hung a wooden bucket from the protruding end of each spout to collect the sap. The buckets were commonly made by cutting cylindrical segments from a large tree trunk and then hollowing out each segment's core from one end of the cylinder, creating a seamless, watertight container. Sap filled the buckets, and was then either transferred to larger holding vessels (barrels, large pots, or hollowed-out wooden logs), often mounted on sledges or wagons pulled by draft animals, or carried in buckets or other convenient containers. The sap-collection buckets were returned to the spouts mounted on the trees, and the process was repeated for as long as the flow of sap remained "sweet". The specific weather conditions of the thaw period were, and still are, critical in determining the length of the sugaring season. As the weather continues to warm, a maple tree's normal early spring biological process eventually alters the taste of the sap, making it unpalatable, perhaps due to an increase in amino acids.

The boiling process was very time-consuming. The harvested sap was transported back to the party's base camp, where it was then poured into large vessels (usually made from metal) and boiled to achieve the desired consistency. The sap was usually transported using large barrels pulled by horses or oxen to a central collection point, where it was processed either over a fire built out in the open or inside a shelter built for that purpose (the "sugar shack").

Since 1850

Around the time of the American Civil War (1861–1865), syrup makers started using large, flat sheet metal pans as they were more efficient for boiling than heavy, rounded iron kettles, because of a greater surface area for evaporation. Around this time, cane sugar replaced maple sugar as the dominant sweetener in the US; as a result, producers focused marketing efforts on maple syrup. The first evaporator, used to heat and concentrate sap, was patented in 1858. In 1872, an evaporator was developed that featured two pans and a metal arch or firebox, which greatly decreased boiling time. Around 1900, producers bent the tin that formed the bottom of a pan into a series of flues, which increased the heated surface area of the pan and again decreased boiling time. Some producers also added a finishing pan, a separate batch evaporator, as a final stage in the evaporation process.

Buckets began to be replaced with plastic bags, which allowed people to see at a distance how much sap had been collected. Syrup producers also began using tractors to haul vats of sap from the trees being tapped (the sugarbush) to the evaporator. Some producers adopted motor-powered tappers and metal tubing systems to convey sap from the tree to a central collection container, but these techniques were not widely used. Heating methods also diversified: modern producers use wood, oil, natural gas, propane, or steam to evaporate sap. Modern filtration methods were perfected to prevent contamination of the syrup.

A large number of technological changes took place during the 1970s. Plastic tubing systems that had been experimental since the early part of the century were perfected, and the sap came directly from the tree to the evaporator house. Vacuum pumps were added to the tubing systems, and preheaters were developed to recycle heat lost in the steam. Producers developed reverse-osmosis machines to take a portion of water out of the sap before it was boiled, increasing processing efficiency.

Improvements in tubing and vacuum pumps, new filtering techniques, "supercharged" preheaters, and better storage containers have since been developed. Research continues on pest control and improved woodlot management. In 2009, researchers at the University of Vermont unveiled a new type of tap that prevents backflow of sap into the tree, reducing bacterial contamination and preventing the tree from attempting to heal the bore hole. Experiments show that it may be possible to use saplings in a plantation instead of mature trees, dramatically boosting productivity per acre. As a result of the smaller tree diameter, milder diurnal temperature swings are needed for the tree to freeze and thaw, which enables sap production in milder climatic conditions outside of northeastern North America.

Processing 

Open pan evaporation methods have been streamlined since colonial days, but remain basically unchanged. Sap must first be collected and boiled down to obtain syrup. Maple syrup is made by boiling between 20 and 50 volumes of sap (depending on its concentration) over an open fire until 1 volume of syrup is obtained, usually at a temperature  over the boiling point of water. As the boiling point of water varies with changes in air pressure the correct value for pure water is determined at the place where the syrup is being produced, each time evaporation is begun and periodically throughout the day. Syrup can be boiled entirely over one heat source or can be drawn off into smaller batches and boiled at a more controlled temperature. Defoamers are often added during boiling.

Boiling the syrup is a tightly controlled process, which ensures appropriate sugar content. Syrup boiled too long will eventually crystallize, whereas under-boiled syrup will be watery, and will quickly spoil. The finished syrup has a density of 66° on the Brix scale (a hydrometric scale used to measure sugar solutions). The syrup is then filtered to remove precipitated "sugar sand", crystals made up largely of sugar and calcium malate. These crystals are not toxic, but create a "gritty" texture in the syrup if not filtered out.

In addition to open pan evaporation methods, many large producers use the more fuel efficient reverse osmosis procedure to separate the water from the sap. Smaller producers can also use batchwise recirculating reverse osmosis, with the most energy-efficient operation taking the sugar concentration to 25% prior to boiling.

The higher the sugar content of the sap, the smaller the volume of sap is needed to obtain the same amount of syrup. To yield 1 unit of syrup, sap at 1.5 percent sugar content will require 57 units, while sap at 3.5 percent sugar content only needs 25 units of sap. The sap's sugar content is highly variable and will fluctuate even within the same tree.

The containers are turned over after being sealed to sterilize the cap with the hot syrup. Packages can be made of metal, glass, or coated plastic, depending on volume and target market. The syrup can also be heated longer and further processed to create a variety of other maple products, including maple sugar, maple butter or cream, and maple candy or taffy.

Off-flavours 

Off-flavours can sometimes develop during the production of maple syrup, resulting from contaminants in the boiling apparatus (such as disinfectants), microorganisms, fermentation products, metallic can flavours, and "buddy sap", an off-flavour occurring late in the syrup season when tree budding has begun. In some circumstances, it is possible to remove off-flavours through processing.

Production 

Maple syrup production is centred in northeastern North America; however, given the correct weather conditions, it can be made wherever suitable species of maple trees grow, such as New Zealand, where there are efforts to establish commercial production.

A maple syrup production farm is called a "sugarbush". Sap is often boiled in a "sugar house" (also known as a "sugar shack", "sugar cabin", "sugar shanty", or cabane à sucre), a building louvered at the top to vent the steam from the boiling sap.

Maples are usually tapped beginning at 30 to 40 years of age. Each tree can support between one and three taps, depending on its trunk diameter. This is roughly equal to seven percent of its total sap. Tap seasons typically happen during late winter and spring and usually last for four to eight weeks, though the exact dates depends on the weather, location, and climate. The timing of the season and the region of maximum sap flow are both expected to be significantly altered by climate change by 2100.

During the day, starch stored in the roots for the winter rises through the trunk as sugary sap, allowing it to be tapped. Sap is not tapped at night because the temperature drop inhibits sap flow, although taps are typically left in place overnight. Some producers also tap in autumn, though this practice is less common than spring tapping. Maples can continue to be tapped for sap until they are over 100 years old.

Commerce 
Until the 1930s, the United States produced most of the world's maple syrup. The vast majority of this comes from the province of Quebec, which is the world's largest producer, with about 70 percent of global production. Canada exported more than C$362 million of maple syrup in 2016. In 2015, 64 percent of Canadian maple syrup exports went to the United States (a value of C$229 million), 8 percent to Germany (C$31 million), 6 percent to Japan (C$26 million), and 5 percent to the United Kingdom (C$16 million).

In 2015, Quebec accounts for 90.83 percent of maple syrup produced in Canada, followed by New Brunswick at 4.83 percent, Ontario at 4.14 percent, and Nova Scotia at 0.2 percent. However, 94.28 percent of exported Canadian maple syrup originated from Quebec, whereas 4.91 percent of exported syrup originated from New Brunswick, and the remaining 0.81 percent from all other provinces. Ontario holds the most maple syrup farms in Canada outside of Quebec, with 2,240 maple syrup producers in 2011. This is followed by New Brunswick, with 191 maple syrup producers; and Nova Scotia, with 152 maple syrup producers.

Production in Quebec is controlled through a supply management system, with producers receiving quota allotments from the government sanctioned Federation of Quebec Maple Syrup Producers (Fédération des producteurs acéricoles du Québec, FPAQ), which also maintains reserves of syrup, although there is a black-market trade in Quebec product. In 2017, the FPAQ mandated increased output of maple syrup production, attempting to establish Quebec's dominance in the world market.

The Canadian provinces of Manitoba and Saskatchewan produce maple syrup using the sap of the box elder or Manitoba maple (Acer negundo). In 2011, there were 67 maple syrup producers in Manitoba, and 24 in Saskatchewan. A Manitoba maple tree's yield is usually less than half that of a similar sugar maple tree. Manitoba maple syrup has a slightly different flavour from sugar-maple syrup, because it contains less sugar and the tree's sap flows more slowly. British Columbia is home to a growing maple sugar industry using sap from the bigleaf maple, which is native to the West Coast of the United States and Canada. In 2011, there were 82 maple syrup producers in British Columbia.

Vermont has long been the largest US producer, with a record  produced in 2022. Wisconsin, Ohio, New Hampshire, Michigan, Pennsylvania, Massachusetts and Connecticut all produced marketable quantities of maple syrup.

Maple syrup has been produced on a small scale in some other countries, notably Japan and South Korea. However, in South Korea in particular, it is traditional to consume maple sap, called gorosoe, instead of processing it into syrup.

Markings 
Under Canadian Maple Product Regulations, containers of maple syrup must include the words "maple syrup", its grade name and net quantity in litres or millilitres, on the main display panel with a minimum font size of 1.6 mm. If the maple syrup is of Canada Grade A level, the name of the colour class must appear on the label in both English and French. Also, the lot number or production code, and either: (1) the name and address of the sugar bush establishment, packing or shipper establishment, or (2) the first dealer and the registration number of the packing establishment, must be labeled on any display panel other than the bottom.

Grades 

Following an effort from the International Maple Syrup Institute (IMSI) and many maple syrup producer associations, both Canada and the United States have altered their laws regarding the classification of maple syrup to be uniform. Whereas in the past each state or province had their own laws on the classification of maple syrup, now those laws define a unified grading system. This had been a work in progress for several years, and most of the finalization of the new grading system was made in 2014. The Canadian Food Inspection Agency (CFIA) announced in the Canada Gazette on 28 June 2014 that rules for the sale of maple syrup would be amended to include new descriptors, at the request of the IMSI.

As of 31 December 2014, the CFIA and as of 2 March 2015, the United States Department of Agriculture (USDA) Agricultural Marketing Service issued revised standards intended to harmonize Canada-United States regulations on the classification of maple syrup as follows:

Grade A
Golden Colour and Delicate Taste
Amber Colour and Rich Taste
Dark Colour and Robust Taste
Very Dark Colour and Strong Taste
Processing Grade
Substandard

As long as maple syrup does not have an off-flavour, is of a uniform colour, and is free from turbidity and sediment, it can be labelled as one of the A grades. If maple syrup does not meet the requirements of Processing Grade maple syrup (including a fairly characteristic maple taste), it is classified as Substandard.

This grading system was accepted and made law by most maple-producing states and provinces, and became compulsory in Canada as of 13 December 2016. Vermont, in an effort to "jump-start" the new grading regulations, adopted the new grading system as of 1 January 2014, after the grade changes passed the Senate and House in 2013. Maine passed a bill to take effect as soon as both Canada and the United States adopted the new grades. In New York, the new grade changes became law on 1 January 2015. New Hampshire did not require legislative approval and so the new grade laws became effective as of 16 December 2014, and producer compliance was required as of 1 January 2016.

Golden and Amber grades typically have a milder flavour than Dark and Very dark, which are both dark and have an intense maple flavour. The darker grades of syrup are used primarily for cooking and baking, although some specialty dark syrups are produced for table use. Syrup harvested earlier in the season tends to yield a lighter colour. With the new grading system, the classification of maple syrup depends ultimately on its internal transmittance at 560 nm wavelength through a 10 mm sample. Golden must have 75 percent or more transmittance, Amber must have 50.0 to 74.9 percent transmittance, Dark must have 25.0 to 49.9 percent transmittance, and Very Dark is any product having less than 25.0 percent transmittance.

Old grading system 

In Canada, maple syrup was classified prior to 31 December 2014, by the Canadian Food Inspection Agency (CFIA) as one of three grades, each with several colour classes:
Canada No. 1, including 
Extra Light, 
Light, and 
Medium; 
No. 2 Amber; and 
No. 3 Dark or any other ungraded category.

Producers in Ontario or Quebec may have followed either federal or provincial grading guidelines. Quebec's and Ontario's guidelines differed slightly from the federal:

there were two "number" categories in Quebec
Number 1, with four colour classes, and 
Number 2, with five colour classes.  
As in Quebec, Ontario's producers had two "number" grades: 
Number 1, with three colour classes; and 
Number 2, with one colour class, which was typically referred to as "Ontario Amber" when produced and sold in that province only.

A typical year's yield for a maple syrup producer will be about 25 to 30 percent of each of the #1 colours, 10 percent #2 Amber, and 2 percent #3 Dark.

The United States used different grading standards ⁠— ⁠some states still do as they await state regulation. Maple syrup was divided into two major grades: 
Grade A:
Light Amber (sometimes known as Fancy), 
Medium Amber, and 
Dark Amber. and, 
Grade B.

In Massachusetts, the Grade B was renamed as Grade A Very Dark, Strong Taste.

The Vermont Agency of Agriculture Food and Markets used a similar grading system of colour, and is roughly equivalent, especially for lighter syrups, but using letters: "AA", "A", etc. The Vermont grading system differed from the US system in maintaining a slightly higher standard of product density (measured on the Baumé scale). New Hampshire maintained a similar standard, but not a separate state grading scale. The Vermont-graded product had 0.9 percent more sugar and less water in its composition than US-graded. One grade of syrup not for table use, called commercial or Grade C, was also produced under the Vermont system.

Packing regulations 
In Canada, the packing of maple syrup must follow the "Packing" conditions stated in the Maple Products Regulations, or utilize the equivalent Canadian or imported grading system.

As stated in the Maple Products Regulations, Canadian maple syrup can be classified as "Canadian Grade A" and "Canadian Processing Grade". Any maple syrup container under these classifications should be filled to at least 90% of the bottle size while still containing the net quantity of syrup product as stated on the label. Every container of maple syrup must be new if it has a capacity of 5 litres or less or is marked with a grade name. Every container of maple sugar must also be new if it has a capacity of less than 5 kg or is either exported out of Canada or conveyed from one province to another.

Each maple syrup product must be verified clean if it follows a grade name or if it is exported out of the province in which it was originally manufactured.

Nutrition 

The basic ingredient in maple syrup is the sap from the xylem of sugar maple or various other species of maple trees. It consists primarily of sucrose and water, with small amounts of the monosaccharides glucose and fructose from the invert sugar created in the boiling process.

In a 100g amount, maple syrup provides 260 calories and is composed of 32 percent water by weight, 67 percent carbohydrates (90 percent of which are sugars), and no appreciable protein or fat (table). Maple syrup is generally low in overall micronutrient content, although manganese and riboflavin are at high levels along with moderate amounts of zinc and calcium (right table). It also contains trace amounts of amino acids which increase in content as sap flow occurs.

Maple syrup contains a wide variety of polyphenols and volatile organic compounds, including vanillin, hydroxybutanone, lignans, propionaldehyde, and numerous organic acids. It is not yet known exactly all compounds responsible for the distinctive flavour of maple syrup, although primary flavour-contributing compounds are maple furanone (5-ethyl-3-hydroxy-4-methyl-2(5H)-furanone), strawberry furanone, and maltol. New compounds have been identified in maple syrup, one of which is quebecol, a natural phenolic compound created when the maple sap is boiled to create syrup. Its sweetness derives from a high content of sucrose (99% of total sugars). Its brown colour – a significant factor in the appeal and quality grading of maple syrup – develops during thermal evaporation.

One author described maple syrup as "a unique ingredient, smooth- and silky-textured, with a sweet, distinctive flavour – hints of caramel with overtones of toffee will not do – and a rare colour, amber set alight. Maple flavour is, well, maple flavour, uniquely different from any other." Agriculture Canada has developed a "flavour wheel" that details 91 unique flavours that can be present in maple syrup. These flavours are divided into 13 families: vanilla, burnt, milky, fruity, floral, spicy, foreign (deterioration or fermentation), foreign (environment), maple, confectionery, plant (herbaceous), plant (forest, humus or cereals), and plant (ligneous). These flavours are evaluated using a procedure similar to wine tasting. Other culinary experts praise its unique flavour.

Maple syrup and its various artificial imitations are widely used as toppings for pancakes, waffles, and French toast in North America. They can also be used to flavour a variety of foods, including fritters, ice cream, hot cereal, fresh fruit, bacon, and sausages. It is also used as sweetener for granola, applesauce, baked beans, candied sweet potatoes, winter squash, cakes, pies, breads, tea, coffee, and hot toddies.

Imitations 
In Canada, maple syrup must be made entirely from maple sap, and syrup must have a density of 66° on the Brix scale to be marketed as maple syrup. In the United States, maple syrup must be made almost entirely from maple sap, although small amounts of substances such as salt may be added. Labeling laws prohibit imitation syrups from having "maple" in their names unless the finished product contains 10 percent or more of natural maple syrup.

"Maple-flavoured" syrups include maple syrup, but may contain additional ingredients. "Pancake syrup", "waffle syrup", "table syrup", and similarly named syrups are substitutes which are less expensive than maple syrup. In these syrups, the primary ingredient is most often high-fructose corn syrup flavoured with sotolon; they have little genuine maple content, and are usually thickened above the viscosity of maple syrup.

Imitation syrups are generally cheaper than maple syrup, with less natural flavour.

In 2016, maple syrup producers from nine US states petitioned the Food and Drug Administration (FDA) to regulate labeling of products containing maple syrup or using the word "maple" in manufactured products, indicating that imitation maple products contained insignificant amounts of natural maple syrup. In September 2016, the FDA published a consumer advisory to carefully inspect the ingredient list of products labeled as "maple".

Cultural significance 

Maple products are considered emblematic of Canada, and are frequently sold in tourist shops and airports as souvenirs from Canada. The sugar maple's leaf has come to symbolize Canada, and is depicted on the country's flag. Several US states, including West Virginia, New York, Vermont, and Wisconsin, have the sugar maple as their state tree. A scene of sap collection is depicted on the Vermont state quarter, issued in 2001.

Maple syrup and maple sugar were used during the American Civil War and by abolitionists in the years before the war because most cane sugar and molasses were produced by Southern slaves. Because of food rationing during the Second World War, people in the northeastern United States were encouraged to stretch their sugar rations by sweetening foods with maple syrup and maple sugar, and recipe books were printed to help housewives employ this alternative source.

See also 
 Canadian cuisine
 List of foods made from maple
 List of syrups
 Mapleine
 
 Great Canadian Maple Syrup Heist
 Treacle

References

Notes

Cited works

Further reading

External links 
 
 Maple Syrup Quality Control Manual, University of Maine
 UVM Center for Digital Initiatives: The Maple Research Collection by the Vermont Agricultural Experiment Station
 US Food and Drug Administration description of table syrup

American cuisine
Articles containing video clips
Canadian cuisine
Cuisine of New York (state)
Cuisine of Quebec
Syrup
Forestry in Canada
Forestry in the United States
Indigenous cuisine in Canada
Maritime culture
New England cuisine
Non-timber forest products
Syrup
Tree tapping